Antonio Maria Viani (born c. 1540) (also called Vianino) was an Italian painter and carver of the Renaissance period. He was born in Cremona. He was a pupil of the Campi. He was court painter to Duke Vincenzo I Gonzaga, and adorned the large gallery of the Ducal Palace at Mantua with groups of children. He worked also at Capua. He died at Mantua at a very advanced age.

Gallery

References

External links

1540s births
17th-century deaths
Artists from Cremona
16th-century Italian painters
Italian male painters
17th-century Italian painters
Painters from Mantua
Renaissance painters
Court painters